Hawassa City Sport Club (Amharic: ሀዋሳ ከተማ  ስፖርት ክለብ), also known as Hawassa Kenema, is a professional Ethiopian football and basketball club based in Hawassa. The football team plays in the Ethiopian Premier League, the top division in Ethiopian football.

History 
Hawassa lifted the trophy in the 2003–04 season beating Lideta Nyala SC, and picked up the Ethiopian cup in the following season. Currently Zelalem Shiferaw is the manager of the team. The club delivered its second Premier League title in the 2006–07 Season.

Hawassa Kenema participated in the 2005 and 2008 CAF Champions League, getting knocked out at the preliminary round each time. They made one appearance in the CAF Confederations Cup (2006), another tournament which they also exited in the preliminary round.

Ghanaian defender Lawrence Lartey joined Hawassa Kenema SC on a one-year contract in October 2017.

In November 2016, at beginning of the 2016–17 season, goalkeeper Kibreab Dawit along with his two children died due to an accident at his home in Hawassa. Kibreab Dawit was the second choice goalkeeper at the time and managed 6 starts since the start of the 2014–15 season. 

During the 2017–18 season the team fired its head coach Wubetu Abate, his assistant Zelalem Shiferaw served as interim coach until the end of the season.

On August 5, 2018, the club announced that had agreed to a two-year contract with Addise Kassa, formerly the manager of Welkite City FC, to become the next head coach of the club.

Stadium 
Their home stadium is Hawassa Stadium which they share with another team, Debub Police S.C.

Academy 
Hawassa is known for producing some of the best young talent in the country such as Adane Girma, Shimeles Bekele, Bahailu Assefa and Mulugeta Mihret. As such the club has one of the most successful academies in Ethiopia with its U17 and U20 teams having won multiple titles in their respective leagues. 

Hawassa Kenema's U-17 team won the 2016–17 U-17 Ethiopian Premier League title for the second year in a row.

Temesgen Dana coached the U17 team until the end of the 2015–16 season and the U20 team from 2016 to 2018 before being promoted to assistant coach of the senior team in August 2018.

Departments 
The Hawassa City Women's football club plays in the Ethiopian Women's Premier League.

Active Departments 

 Women's Football Team
 Football Team (U20)

Logos

Honors

Domestic 
Ethiopian Premier League: 2
2004, 2007

Ethiopian Cup: 1
2005

African
CAF Champions League: 2 appearances
2005 – Preliminary Round
2008 – Preliminary Round

CAF Confederation Cup: 1 appearance
2006 – Preliminary Round

CAF Cup: 1 appearance
2000 – Second Round

Players

First-team squad
As of 8 January 2021

Club Officials

Coaching staff 

 Manager/Head Coach:  Mulugeta Mihret

Former players 

  Behailu Demeke

Former Managers 

Wubetu Abate
Zelalem Shiferaw (as interim coach)
Addise Kassa
Kemal Ahmed

References

External links
 
 Club logo

Football clubs in Ethiopia
1978 establishments in Ethiopia
Association football clubs established in 1978
Sidama Region